The California Oaks is an American Thoroughbred horse race held annually in February at Golden Gate Fields in Berkeley, California. Open to three-year-old fillies, it is contested on Tapeta Footings synthetic dirt over a distance of a mile and a sixteenth (8.5 furlongs). 

The event is an ungraded stakes race with a current purse of $75,000 and has been a prep race to the Triple Tiara of Thoroughbred Racing, including the Kentucky Oaks, the Black-Eyed Susan Stakes and Mother Goose Stakes.

Records
Speed record: 
  miles - 1:39.04 - Sky Mystic (2008) 

Most wins by a jockey:
 4 - Russell Baze   (2009, 2011, 2012, 2014)

Most wins by a trainer:
 4 - Doug O'Neill (2013, 2015, 2017, 2019)

Winners of the California Oaks since 1994

See also
Road to the Kentucky Oaks

References

The 2009 California Oaks race results at Bloodhorse.com
The 2008 California Oaks race results at Bloodhorse.com

Horse races in California
Golden Gate Fields
Restricted stakes races in the United States
Flat horse races for three-year-old fillies